The 1941 Bulgarian Cup  (in this period the tournament was named Tsar's Cup) was the fourth cup competition, which took place in parallel to the national championship. The cup was won by AS 23 Sofia who beat Napredak Ruse 4–2 in the final at the City Stadium in Dobrich.

First round 

|}

Quarter-finals 

|}

Semi-finals 

|}

Final

Details

1941
Bulgarian Cup
Cup